25th Street is a light rail station on the LYNX Blue Line in the Optimist Park neighborhood of Charlotte, North Carolina, United States. It opened on March 16, 2018, as part of the Blue Line extension to the UNC Charlotte campus. The station features an island platform and is located in Optimist Park.

References

External links

25th Street Station

Lynx Blue Line stations
Railway stations in the United States opened in 2018
2018 establishments in North Carolina